The Vallibel Wind Farm (also called Willwind Wind Farm and Willpita Wind Farm) is a small  onshore wind farm built near the village of Bithugalgama, in the Ratnapura District of Sri Lanka. The facility consists of seven wind turbines measuring approximately  each.

See also 

 Electricity in Sri Lanka
 Ambewela Aitken Spence Wind Farm

References

External links 
 

Wind farms in Sri Lanka
Buildings and structures in Ratnapura District